Moshe Wolman (November 10, 1914 – September 5, 2009) was an Israeli neuropathologist. He is considered one of the fathers of histochemistry. In 1954, he described Wolman's disease.

Biography 
Moshe Wolman was born in 1914 in Warsaw, Poland. He immigrated to Mandate Palestine in 1925. He grew up in Tel Aviv and graduated from the prestigious Herzliya Gymnasium (academic secondary school). He studied medicine in Italy (Florence 1932-1935 and Rome, 1935–1938). In 1939, he married Brigitte "Bigi" Koebbel with whom he had four children: filmmaker Dan Wolman, philosopher Ruth Manor (1944–2005), psychiatrist Naomi Oren, and composer Amnon Wolman.

Medical career
From 1938 to 1940, he worked in the Cancer Research Institute of the Hebrew University and did residency at the department of Internal Medicine of the Hadassah Hospital. In the 1940s, he volunteered to serve in the British Army and joined the 101 Military Mission (the famous Gideon Force of Orde Wingate). He was involved in the operation in 1941 that brought Emperor Haile Selassie back to occupied Ethiopia and was in charge of a medical ward and clinical laboratory in the Menelik Hospital in Addis Ababa in  1941-1944. In 1944, he was posted in the Central Pathology Laboratory of the Middle East Forces located in Cairo, Egypt. In 1945 he was appointed as head of the Pathology Laboratory of the 27th General Hospital in Tel-El-Kabir, Egypt.
 
After his release from the army in 1946, Wolman joined the department of Pathology of the Hadassah Hospital in Jerusalem and was involved in histochemical research. He taught at the newly founded Medical School of the Hebrew University. In this period, he studied the chemical significance of the periodic acid-Schiff (PAS) staining method and showed that the method is not specific for carbohydrates as was thought at the time, but also stains lipids.

In 1951 his research included histochemistry of viral and non-viral inclusion bodies and he continued to study chemical fixatives and fixation techniques. He showed that proteoglycans and polysaccharides of different pK values in their end groups can be differently stained which resulted in the development of Bi-Col procedure (Wolman, 1956). In fact, advances in our understanding of the chemical nature of ground substance remained largely neglected for a generation.

Wolman also studied chemical factors underlying various impregnation procedures for the nervous system. He was also involved in research on demyelination of peripheral nerve sheaths and also showed that black osmium staining light microscopy and its electron density for electron microscopy, appears first in carbohydrates before it stains unsaturated lipids. He also demonstrated the presence of a carbohydrate-containing moiety in myelin (later shown by others to be different proteoglycans) and its importance in myelin breakdown. His research was focused on the oxidation of lipids, the formation of lipid peroxides, their polymerization, and the pathogenesis and nature of lipid pigments.

In 1959, Wolman was appointed head of the Department of Pathology of the Tel Hashomer Government Hospital (later renamed as the Chaim Sheba Medical Center). He continued to study peripheral nerve demyelinization and membrane structures. Using enzyme histochemical methods, he and his coworkers were able to prove that changes in ion concentrations can induce phase changes in cell membranes. Another study dealt with the substance (or substances) called amyloid (Wolman 1971).

Understanding of the chemistry involved in histological techniques enabled Moshe Wolman in the 1950s to determine that the storage disease, that was later named after him is known as lysosomal acid lipase deficiency or Wolman disease, is caused by accumulation in cells of a mixture of cholesterol and triglycerides and differed substantially from Niemann–Pick disease. (Wolman, 1989).

Wolman formulated the theory and use of polarization microscopy in routine pathology and diagnostic molecular research. He was one of the first to recognize that polarized light microscopy is a powerful tool, which allows the detection of structures that otherwise be obtained only with great difficulty (Wolman, 1970).

In 1964, Wolman was appointed full professor and head of the Department of Pathology at the newly founded Medical School of Tel Aviv University. In 1967, he was also appointed chair of the Department of Cell Biology and Histology.

Wolman authored more than 200 publications and contributions to books. Over the years, he contributed chapters to many textbooks and served on numerous editorial boards including Histochemie.

He was deeply interested in educational and ethical questions. He published a book on ethics and demagoguery and served as chairperson of the ethics committee of the Israel Medical Association. He was concerned with the issues of medical errors and published a book on the subject together with his daughter, Ruth Manor, "Doctor's Errors and Mistakes of Medicine: Must Health Care Deteriorate?" (2004).

Awards and legacy
Wolman was a member of the Histochemical Society (USA), the Society for Experimental Biology and Medicine and the Israel Association of Pathologists and the Gesellschaft fur Histochemie. In 1966, he was elected as a member of the Deutsche Akademie der Naturforscher Leopoldina. In 1984, he founded the Israel Society for Histochemistry and Cytochemistry and served as its president until 1990.

Wolman  was the first recipient of the Pearse Prize for Histochemistry awarded by the Royal Microscopical Society (Wolman, 1989) and also received the Pioneer Award of the International Federation of Histochemical Societies (Carpenter, 1990). In 2000, an annual Wolman lecture was inaugurated by the Israel Society for Histochemistry and Cytochemistry. He was appointed emeritus professor of the Tel Aviv University in 1985 and despite being formally retired remained active and remained a continued source of knowledge and wisdom well into his eighties. His opening remarks in his Pearse Prize Lecture show the wisdom of a great scientist, “…after all, our scientific work is amply rewarded by the clear moments when complex and difficult problems become simple and understandable” (Wolman, 1989).

In 2002, Coleman attributed the enormous progress in the development of histochemistry in Israel  to the "pioneering research and wisdom of Moshe Wolman."

Published works

Editor
The Healing and Scarring of Atheroma.  Advances in Experimental Medicine and Biology, New York, 1984, volume 168.
Pigments in Pathology, Academic Press, New York, NY. 1969

Author
A histochemical method for the differential staining of acidic tissue components (particularly ground-substance polysaccharides), Bull Res Council Israel. 1956
Histochemistry and lipids in pathology. Handbuch of Histochemie. Fischer, Stuttgart, Germany. 1964
On the Use of polarized microscopy in pathology, Pathol Annu. 1970
Amyloid, its nature and molecular structure, Lab Invest. 1971
Biological peroxidation of lipids and membranes, Israel J Med Sci. 1975
An experiment in teaching histology and cell biology, Med Teacher. 1985
Macrophages and their acid esterase in atherosclerosis. Pearse Prize Lecture Speech delivered 5 January 1988) Pro Roy Microsc Soc. 1989
Lipid pigments, Fischer, Stuttgart, Germany. 1993
Doctors' Errors and Mistakes of Medicine: Must Health Care Deteriorate? (Biomedical and Health Research, Volume 59) by Moshe Wolman and Ruth Manor (Hardcover - Jun 1, 2004)
The Healing and Scarring of Atheroma (Advances in Experimental Medicine and Biology) by Moshe Wolman (Hardcover - Feb 1984)
Pigments in Pathology by Moshe Wolman (Hardcover - Jan 1, 1969)
Histochemistry of lipids in pathology (Handbuch der Histochemie) by Moshe Wolman (Unknown Binding - 1964)
Biological peroxidation of lipids and membranes (Israel journal of medical sciences) by Moshe Wolman (Unknown Binding - 1975)

See also
Health care in Israel

References

Israeli scientists
Academic staff of Tel Aviv University
1914 births
2009 deaths
Israeli military doctors
Israeli pathologists
British Army personnel of World War II
Polish emigrants to Mandatory Palestine